Celestino Cavedoni (18 May 1795 at Levizzano-Rangone, near Modena – 26 November 1865 in Modena) was an Italian ecclesiastic, archeologist, and numismatist.

He pursued his theological studies in the diocesan seminary, and from 1816 to 1821 distinguished himself in the study of archeologist and the Greek and Hebrew languages at the University of Bologna. He was then appointed custodian of the Numismatical Museum of Modena, and received a position in the City Library, of which he became librarian in 1847. From 1830 to 1863 he held the chair of hermeneutics at the University of Modena.

Cavedoni was a corresponding member of the commission created by Napoleon III to edit the works of Count Bartolomeo Borghesi, to which collection he contributed numerous scientific notes. Among his numismatic works may be mentioned Saggio di osservazioni sulle medaglie di famiglie romane (1829); Carellii nummorum Italiæ Veteris tabulæ (Leipzig, 1850); and Numismatica Biblica (Modena, 1850; German tr. by Werlhof, Hanover, 1855–56). Cavedoni contributed numerous historical and archæological papers to the Annali and the Bullettino of the Archæological Institute of Rome and to other Italian publications. In religious polemics he wrote a critique of Ernest Renan's Life of Jesus, Confutazione dei principali errori di Ernesto Renan nella sua Vie de Jésus (Modena, 1863), which passed through four editions in several months.

References

Attribution
  Cites as sources:
 BERTAUX, in La Grande Encyclopédie, IX, 967;
 HURTER, Nomenclator (Innsbruck 1895), III, 1024–25.

1795 births
1865 deaths
Italian numismatists
Italian archaeologists